Özgür İleri (born 17 November 1987 in İzmir, Turkey) is a Turkish professional footballer who plays as a midfielder for Pendikspor.

Career
İleri began his career at the Metaspor football school in 2001. He was transferred to Dardanelspor in 2003, where he has played since.

İleri is also a youth international.

References

1989 births
Living people
Footballers from İzmir
Turkish footballers
Turkey under-21 international footballers
Dardanelspor footballers
Göztepe S.K. footballers
Boluspor footballers
Kastamonuspor footballers
Süper Lig players
TFF First League players
TFF Second League players
Association football defenders